Prayers or Meditations, written in 1545 by the English queen Catherine Parr, was the first book published in England by a woman under her own name and in the English language. It first appeared in print on 8 June 1545. Preceded in the previous year by her anonymously published Psalms or Prayers, the 60-page book consisted of vernacular texts selected and assembled by the Queen for personal devotion. It is based on the much longer 15th-century Catholic devotional book by Thomas à Kempis, The Imitation of Christ, but reoriented for the purposes of the developing Church of England.

Parr envisaged it as a private counterpart to the Exhortation and Litany, authored for public devotion by the Archbishop of Canterbury Thomas Cranmer. Archbishop Cranmer's was the first such work for the Church of England to receive royal approval; to be released for general use, Queen Catherine too must have needed to obtain permission of her husband, King Henry VIII, as well as approval of the Archbishop.

Prayers or Meditations reached a remarkable number of editions in the 16th century and was overall very successful among English readers during Parr's lifetime and after her death in 1548. Her stepdaughter Elizabeth translated it into Latin, French and Italian as a New Year's gift to Henry VIII.

See also
 The Lamentation of a Sinner, Parr's second book published under her own name.

References

Sources

External links
 

Catherine Parr
English Reformation
Religious books
1545 books
1545 in England